Camafroneta is a genus of dwarf spiders containing the single species, Camafroneta oku. It was  first described by H. Frick & N. Scharff in 2018, and is only found in Cameroon.

References

External links

Endemic fauna of Cameroon
Linyphiidae
Monotypic Araneomorphae genera